Lithium sulfide is the inorganic compound with the formula Li2S.  It crystallizes in the antifluorite motif, described as the salt (Li+)2S2−.  It forms a solid yellow-white deliquescent powder.  In air, it easily hydrolyses to release hydrogen sulfide (rotten egg odor).

Preparation
Lithium sulfide is prepared by treating lithium with sulfur.  This reaction is conveniently conducted in anhydrous ammonia.

2 Li + S  → Li2S

The THF-soluble triethylborane adduct of lithium sulfide can be generated using superhydride.

Reactions and applications
Lithium sulfide has been considered for use in lithium–sulfur batteries.

References

External links
 Lithium Sulfide

Lithium salts
Sulfides
Fluorite crystal structure